Aswaddhama (also spelled as Aswathama) is a 1988 Indian Telugu-language action film written by Paruchuri Brothers and directed by B. Gopal starring Krishna in the titular role alongside Vijayashanti, Nutan Prasad, Sarada and Mohan Babu. The film was produced by M. Krishna and Sekhar in the banner of Sri Raghavendra Art Picture.

The story follows a daring bus driver, Aswaddhama who after getting implicated in a false case by his evil master, Subrahmanyam, wages a war against injustice and in the process rises from rags to riches.

Cast

Songs 
The film's soundtrack album scored and composed by Chakravarthy consisted of 5 tracks.
 "O Jabbili"
 "Ashwathamakku"
 "Orandhagaada"
 "Andhaala Bomma"
 "Sigetti Kottamakku"

Release and reception 
The film was successful at the box office.

Sources 
 Aswathama film info

References

External links 

1980s Telugu-language films
1988 films
Indian action films
Films directed by B. Gopal
Films scored by K. Chakravarthy
1988 action films